Conservatives without Conscience is a book written by John Dean, who served as White House Counsel under U.S. President Richard Nixon and then helped to break the Watergate scandal with his testimony before the United States Senate. The book analyzes the evolution of the Republican Party, and the different forms of conservatism, largely in terms of authoritarian personality. It was published in 2006 by Viking Press.

The book makes extensive use of the research into right-wing authoritarianism of University of Manitoba professor Bob Altemeyer. The title is a play on The Conscience of a Conservative, a seminal book attributed to the Republican nominee in the 1964 presidential campaign, U.S. Senator Barry Goldwater, but ghostwritten by L. Brent Bozell Jr. Dean claims that he and Goldwater had planned to write such a book in the 1980s in response to their disaffection with the Religious Right.

External links
Conservatives without Conscience from Viking Press
People's Weekly World review
The Authoritarian Social Dominators identified by John Dean
Presentation by Dean on Conservatives Without Conscience, July 13, 2006, C-SPAN
Presentation by Dean on Conservatives Without Conscience, September 5, 2006, C-SPAN

2006 non-fiction books
Books about politics of the United States
Books critical of conservatism in the United States
English-language books
Viking Press books